İbrahim Halil Keser (born 2 July 1997) is a Turkish footballer who most recently played as a midfielder for Gaziantepspor. He made his Süper Lig debut on 17 May 2013 against Mersin İdman Yurdu.

References

External links
 
 

1997 births
Living people
Sportspeople from Adıyaman
Turkish footballers
Gaziantepspor footballers
Süper Lig players
Association football midfielders